The R333 road is a regional road in Ireland connecting the N83 southwest of Tuam, County Galway, to the N84 in Headford, County Galway.

See also
Roads in Ireland
National primary road
National secondary road

References
Roads Act 1993 (Classification of Regional Roads) Order 2006 – Department of Transport

Regional roads in the Republic of Ireland
Roads in County Galway